The following is a partial list of Coptic Orthodox Churches in Canada, the count stands at 64 churches and communities:

Diocese of Mississauga, Vancouver & Western Canada 

The Hierarch of this diocese is Bishop Mina, Bishop of the Holy Diocese of Mississauga, Vancouver & Western Canada.

The following is a list of the churches under the diocese:

Alberta
St. Mary & St. George Coptic Orthodox Church, Red Deer
St. Mary & St. Mark Coptic Orthodox Church, Edmonton
St. Mina Coptic Orthodox Church, Calgary
St. Mary & St. Paul Coptic Orthodox Church, Calgary

British Columbia
St. George Coptic Orthodox Church, Surrey (Burned)
St. Mark & St. Philopateer Coptic Orthodox Church, Vancouver
St. Mary Coptic Orthodox Church, Surrey
St. Pope Cyrill Coptic Orthodox Church, Vancouver Island

Manitoba
St. Mark Coptic Orthodox Church, Winnipeg
St. Mina & St. Anthony Coptic Orthodox Church, Brandon

Ontario (Mississauga & Western Ontario)
SEE BELOW FOR EASTERN ONTARIO CHURCHES
SEE FURTHER BELOW FOR OTHER CHURCHES IN THE GREATER TORONTO AREA
Archangel Michael & St. Tekla Coptic Orthodox Church, Brampton
Archangel Raphael and St. Marina Coptic Orthodox Church, Burlington
St. Philopateer Mercurius Coptic Orthodox Church, Guelph
St. Mina Coptic Orthodox Church, Hamilton

 St. Mary & St Maurice Coptic Orthodox Church, Kitchener

St. Paul the Anchorite Coptic Orthodox Church, London
St. George & St. Abanoub Coptic Orthodox Church, Milton
The 7 altars Coptic Church, Mississauga
Canadian Coptic Orthodox Church of the Nativity, Mississauga
Canadian Coptic Orthodox Church of the Resurrection, Mississauga
St. Mark and St. Demiana Coptic Orthodox Church, Mississauga
St. Maximus & St. Dometius Coptic Orthodox Chapel, Mississauga 
St. Mina & St. Kyrillos Coptic Orthodox Church, Mississauga
St. Philopateer & St. Anthony Coptic Orthodox Church, Mississauga
The Prophet Daniel & the Three Saintly Youth Coptic Orthodox Church, Mississauga
Virgin Mary & St. Athanasius Coptic Orthodox Church, Mississauga

The Valley of the Mother of God, Mono
St. Peter and St. Paul Coptic Orthodox Church, Oakville
St. George & St. Mercurius Abu Sefein Coptic Orthodox Church, St. Catharines
St. Mary & St. Moses the Black Coptic Orthodox Church, Windsor

Saskatchewan
 St. Mark & St. George Coptic Orthodox Church, Regina
 St. Mary & St. Mina Coptic Orthodox Church, Saskatoon

Diocese of Ottawa, Montréal and Eastern Canada
The Hierarch of this diocese is Bishop Boules, Bishop of the Holy Diocese of Ottawa, Montreal & Eastern Canada

The following is a list of the churches under the diocese:

New Brunswick
 Holy Virgin Mary & St. George Coptic Orthodox Church, Saint John

Newfoundland and Labrador
St. Maurice Coptic Orthodox Church, Mount Pearl
St. Mary & St. Verena Coptic Orthodox Church, Gander
Coptic Community, Grand Falls
Coptic Community, Corner Brook

Nova Scotia
St. Mena Coptic Orthodox Church, Halifax

Ontario (Eastern Ontario)

St. Anthony Monastery, Perth
St. George & St. Anthony Coptic Orthodox Church, Ottawa
St. Joseph Coptic Orthodox Church, Ottawa
St. Mark & St. Mary of Egypt Coptic Orthodox Church, Ottawa (Mission Church)
St. Mary Coptic Orthodox Church, Ottawa
St. Mina Coptic Orthodox Church, Kingston

Québec
St. Mark Coptic Orthodox Church, Montreal
St. George & St. Joseph Coptic Orthodox Church, Pierrefonds
Virgin Mary Coptic Orthodox Church, Saint-Hubert
Archangel Michael & St. Mercorios Coptic Orthodox Church, Laval
St. Peter & St. Paul Coptic Orthodox Church, Pointe-Claire (Mission Church)
Virgin Mary, St. Mina & Pope Kyrillos Coptic Orthodox Church, Sainte-Foy
St. Mina & Pope Cyril VI Coptic Orthodox Church, Sainte-Thérèse
Holy Trinity Eritrean Orthodox Church, Lachine
St. John the Baptist Coptic Orthodox Church, Vaudreuil-Dorion

Archdiocese of North America

The following is a list of the churches under the Archdiocese of North America:

Ontario
Archangel Michael & St. Mina Coptic Orthodox Church, North York, Toronto
St. Bishoy Coptic Orthodox Church, Stouffville 
St. George & St. Rueiss Coptic Orthodox Church, North York, Toronto
St. John the Baptist & St. Elizabeth Coptic Orthodox Church, Oro-Medonte
St. Mark Coptic Orthodox Church, Toronto
St. Mark's Coptic Orthodox Cathedral, Markham
St. Mary & St. Abraam Coptic Orthodox Church, Ajax
St. Mary & St. John the Beloved Coptic Orthodox Church, Pickering
St. Mary & St. Joseph Coptic Orthodox Church, Richmond Hill
St. Mary & St. Samuel the Confessor Coptic Orthodox Church, Markham
St. Maurice & St. Verena Coptic Orthodox Church, Markham
St. Moses & St. Katherine Coptic Orthodox Church, Toronto
St. Philopateer Mercurius & St. Shenouda Coptic Orthodox Church, North York, Toronto
Ti Agia Maria & St. Demiana Coptic Orthodox Church, Etobicoke, Toronto
Virgin Mary & The Apostles Peter & Paul Coptic Orthodox Church, Vaughan
St. Philopateer and St. Demiana Coptic Orthodox Church, Newmarket
St. Mary and St. Mark Coptic Orthodox Church, Sudbury

Gallery

See also
Coptic (disambiguation)
Coptic Canadians
Coptic Orthodox Church of Alexandria
Coptic Orthodox Church in North America
Coptic Orthodox Church in the United States
List of Coptic Orthodox Churches in the United States
Coptic Orthodox Church in Canada
Oriental Orthodoxy in North America

References

Canada
Canada
Coptic Orthodox
Coptic Orthodox
Coptic Canadian
Oriental Orthodoxy-related lists
Canada